H. Wright was a New Zealand cricketer. He played three first-class matches for Auckland between 1912 and 1914.

See also
 List of Auckland representative cricketers

References

External links
 

Year of birth missing
Year of death missing
New Zealand cricketers
Auckland cricketers
Place of birth missing